Jim Wilson is a former Oklahoma State Senator from District 3, which includes Adair, Cherokee and Sequoyah counties, from 2004 to 2012. He earlier was a member of the Oklahoma House of Representatives from 2000 through 2004. He ran unsuccessfully against Democratic Incumbent US Rep. Dan Boren in Oklahoma's 2nd Congressional District in the July 27, 2010 Democratic primary.

Legislative record 
In response to a bill granting full rights of personhood to fertilized eggs, Wilson introduced an unsuccessful amendment which would have made the fathers of the embryos responsible for the housing, transportation, nourishment and healthcare of the mother during the pregnancy.

Election results

References

External links
Senator Jim Wilson - District 3 official State Senate website
Project Vote Smart - Jim Wilson (OK) profile
Follow the Money - Jim Wilson
2008 2006 2004 State Senate campaign contributions
2000 State House campaign contributions

1947 births
Living people
People from Lake Mills, Wisconsin
Democratic Party Oklahoma state senators
Democratic Party members of the Oklahoma House of Representatives
21st-century American politicians